The dorsal metatarsal ligaments are ligaments in the foot.

Ligaments of the lower limb